Bresciaoggi is a morning daily newspaper that serves the Brescia, Lombardy metropolitan area of Italy. The paper was founded in 1974.

References

External links
 

1974 establishments in Italy
Italian-language newspapers
Daily newspapers published in Italy
Publications established in 1974
Mass media in Brescia